Sagar Mangalorkar (born 19 September 1990) is an Indian cricketer who plays for Baroda.

References

External links
 

1990 births
Living people
Indian cricketers
Baroda cricketers
Burgher Recreation Club cricketers
Cricketers from Mangalore